'Michael Ward (1643-1681) was a 17th-century Anglican bishop and academic in Ireland.

Ward was the son of Richard Ward. He was born in Newport, Shropshire and educated at Trinity College Dublin. Ward was Regius Professor of Divinity at Trinity College Dublin from 1670 to 1678 and its Provost from 1674 to 1678; Dean of Lismore from 1670 to 1678; Archdeacon of Armagh from 1674 to 1678; Bishop of Ossory from 1678 to 1680; and Derry from 1680; until his death on 3 October 1681. His early death at 38 cut short a career which saw his meteoric rise to high office, fuelled by his great ambition.

His nephew, also  Michael Ward, was an Irish politician and judge, and father of the first Viscount Bangor.

Notes

External links

 

    

Year of birth unknown
1681 deaths
Alumni of Trinity College Dublin
Anglican bishops of Ossory
Anglican bishops of Derry
Archdeacons of Armagh
Deans of Lismore
Clergy from Shropshire
Provosts of Trinity College Dublin
Regius Professors of Divinity (University of Dublin)